Jim Cotter may refer to:

Jim Cotter (priest) (born 1942), British priest and poet
Jim Cotter (composer) (born 1948), Australian composer
Jim Cotter (curler) (born 1974), Canadian curler

See also
James Cotter (disambiguation)